Wild yeast could refer to:

Yeast#Ecology
Yeast in winemaking
Brewing#Spontaneous fermentation 
Sourdough
Cider#Yeast